Collis Llewellyn King (born 11 June 1951) is a former West Indies first-class cricketer who played nine Test matches and 18 One Day Internationals for the West Indies cricket team between 1976 and 1980.

Born in Christ Church, Barbados, King played as an all-rounder, but had more success with the bat than ball, especially in Test cricket, where he scored one century and two fifties but only took three wickets – in three different innings. In ODI cricket, his highest – and swiftest – score came in the 1979 World Cup final, when he came in at 99 for 4 to hit 86 off 66 deliveries, and added 139 with Viv Richards. King also held a catch and bowled three overs for 13 runs in the match, and the West Indies won by 92 runs.

King went on both the 1982/83 and 1983/84 West Indies' rebel tours to South Africa.

In a varied first-class career, he played for his native country Barbados in the West Indies domestic competition, and also played for Glamorgan and Worcestershire in English county cricket and Natal in South Africa. In scoring 123 on his Worcestershire debut in 1983, he became the first player in more than fifty years to score a hundred in his first match for the county.

King was still playing club cricket for Yorkshire side Dunnington CC into his sixties.

References

1951 births
Living people
People from Christ Church, Barbados
Barbados cricketers
Cricketers at the 1979 Cricket World Cup
Glamorgan cricketers
KwaZulu-Natal cricketers
West Indies One Day International cricketers
West Indies Test cricketers
Barbadian cricketers
Worcestershire cricketers
World Series Cricket players
D. B. Close's XI cricketers